Parisella is a surname. Notable people with the surname include:

Jerry Parisella, American politician from Massachusetts 
John Parisella (born 1944), American horse trainer